Musée historique may refer to:
Musée historique de Strasbourg
Musée historique de Mulhouse
Musée historique de Haguenau